Austin Conroy Lenroy Richards (born 14 November 1983) is a West Indies cricketer who plays for the Leeward Islands. He earned his first international call up when he was named in the West Indian side for a One Day International series in England in 2007.

References

1983 births
Living people
People from Saint Philip Parish, Antigua
West Indies One Day International cricketers
West Indies Twenty20 International cricketers
Leeward Islands cricketers
Antigua and Barbuda cricketers
West Indies B cricketers